Gregory Clark Huffman (born 1967) is a United States Navy rear admiral who serves as commander of Carrier Strike Group 12 since June 17, 2021. Prior to that, he served as director of operations and plans of the Operations, Plans and Strategy Directorate (N3), with command tours including the USS John C. Stennis and USS Green Bay. He graduated from the United States Naval Academy in 1989. Huffman became a rear admiral with Senate confirmation in 2019.

Huffman earned an M.A. degree in history from the University of Maryland in 1989 and an M.S. degree in aviation systems from the University of Tennessee in 2000.

References

External links

1967 births
Living people
Place of birth missing (living people)
United States Naval Academy alumni
University System of Maryland alumni
United States Naval Aviators
United States Naval Test Pilot School alumni
University of Tennessee alumni
Recipients of the Air Medal
Recipients of the Meritorious Service Medal (United States)
Recipients of the Legion of Merit
United States Navy admirals
Recipients of the Defense Superior Service Medal